

The Nieuport-Delage NiD 38 was a touring aircraft built in small numbers in France in the early 1920s. It was a single-bay biplane of conventional design with an enclosed cabin for two passengers and an open cockpit for the pilot.

The prototype was exhibited at the 1924 Salon de l'Aéronautique in Paris, and orders for four machines were placed by the airline Compagnie Aérienne Française. Two of these had their passenger compartments replaced by mail holds, and were used on the Geneva–Bordeaux airmail route.

Variants
 NiD 38 - production version with Hispano-Suiza 8Ab engine (3 built)
 NiD 381 - version with Renault 8Gd (1 built)

Operators
 France
 Compagnie Aérienne Française

Specifications (NiD 38)

Notes

References

 
 
 
 

1920s French civil utility aircraft
 038
Aircraft first flown in 1924
Biplanes
Single-engined tractor aircraft